Discography of Japanese pop singer T.M.Revolution.

Since announcing T.M. Revolution, Takanori Nishikawa has released 12 studio albums, 8 album  compilations, two "self-style covers" album, 1 pre-debut singles, 41 singles, and 15 digital single.

Albums

As T.M.Revolution

Makes Revolution (August 12, 1996) 
1. We Make Revolution
2. Dokusai -monopolize- ESPECIAL D-Mix
3. BLACK OR WHITE? ESPECIAL "MATT" Mix
4. PIN UP LADY
5. yume no shizuku
6. URBAN BEASTS
7. hesojokujo -venus- ESPECIAL D-Mix
8. LIAR'S SMILE
9. HEALING MY SOUL
restoration LEVEL➝3 (February 21, 1997) 
1. restoration LEVEL -> 3
2. HEART OF SWORD ~yoake mae~ ESPECIAL "MATT" Mix
3. Tomorrow Meets Resistance
4. DYNAMITE PASSION
5. kageri
6. tomedonasouna BOKUra ~BEDLESS NIGHT SLIDER~
7. IMITATION CRIME
8. SHAKIN' LOVE '97 ~LIVE REVOLUTION~
9. HEART OF SWORD ~yoake mae~
triple joker (January 21, 1998) 
1. aoi hekireki
2. OH! MY GIRL, OH MY GOD! -MORNING SURPRISE MIX-
3. WHITE BREATH -MORE FREEZE MIX-
4. O.L
5. MID-NITE WARRIORS
6. LEVEL 4 -LEVEL->V MIX-
7. Slight faith
8. MinD ESCAPE
9. Joker -G CODE MIX-
10. Twinkle Million Rendezvous
11. HIGH PRESSURE -MORE HEAT MIX-
12. JUST A JOKE
the force (March 10, 1999) 
1. WILD RUSH (Album mix)
2. UNTOUCHABLE Girls (Album mix)
3. THUNDERBIRD (Album mix)
4. anadori ga taki bokura
5. HOT LIMIT (Album mix)
6. Salsa Bazaar
7. AQUALOVERS~DEEP into the night (Album mix)
8. totteokino ohanashi~shinsetu renai shinkaron
9. DREAM DRUNKER
10. Burnin' X'mas (Album mix)
11. True Merry Rings
12. Proimised FORCE
progress (October 12, 2000)
1. resurrection I
2. I.D.~LOVE ME CRAZY~
3. LOVE SAVER
4. BLACK OR WHITE? version 3
5. last resort
6. madan ~Der Freischütz~
7. VITAL BURNER
8. Private Storm
9. fragile
10. HEAT CAPACITY
11. Trace Millennium Road
12. Master Feel Sad
13. LIGHT MY FIRE
14. resurrection II
coordinate (March 26, 2003)
1. ABORT//CLEAR-
2. Out Of Orbit~Triple ZERO~ (phase shift mix)
3. INVOKE-
4. Meteor-
5. NEO SPHERE-
6. BRIGADE
7. Juggling ~acoustic GTR "turbo" starter~
8. Tide Moon River
9. BOARDING (phase shift armoured version)
10. INVOKE (TV opening version)
11. THUNDERBIRD ~version "in the force"~
12. HEART OF SWORD ~yoake mae~ (U.S. release exclusive)
SEVENTH HEAVEN (March 17, 2004) 
1. Key of SEVENTH HEAVEN
2. Albireo (album ver.)
3. Zips
4. destined for...
5. ARTERIAL FEAR
6. Graceful World
7. GUNJOH
8. Get Over The Rain
9. Engraved On the Moon
10. Tears Macerate Reason
11. Wheel of fortune
vertical infinity (January 26, 2005) 
1. Vertical Infinity
2. Ignited
3. To-Ri-Ko
4. Timeless - Möbius Rover
5. Web of Night [English Album Version]
6. Ultimate
7. Mohaya - Can't Begin Without You
8. Scarlet Sand
9. Bring It On
10. White Darkness
11. Chase/The Thrill
12. Web of Night [Japanese Album Version] (U.S release exclusive)
13. Albireo [DVD][Live] (U.S. release exclusive)
CLOUD NINE (April 20, 2011) 
1. CLOUD NINE ~Instrumental~
2. Pearl in the Shell
3. Naked Arms
4. Mizu ni Utsuru Tsuki
5. Wasteland Lost
6. Thousand Morning Refrain
7. SWORD SUMMIT
8. 09 lives
9. Fate & Faith
10. Reload
11. Fortune Maker
12. Save the One, Save the All
Ten (May 13, 2015) 
01. The ether
02. DOUBLE-DEAL
03. AMAKAZE -Tenpu-
04. Tsuki Yabureru - Time to SMASH!
05. Thread of fate
06. HEAVEN ONLY KNOWS ～Get the Power～
07. Summer Blizzard
08. Salvage
09. Dream Crusader
10. Phantom Pain
11. CRIMSON AIR
12. Count ZERO
13. FLAGS
14. The party must go on
15. The edge of Heaven & Revolution
16. 突キ破レル-Time to SMASH ! （Re:boot）	
17. Thread of fate (Re:boot）

As Takanori Nishikawa
SINGularity (March 6, 2019) 
01. SINGularity
02. Roll The Dice
03. Bright Burning Shout
04. Hear Me
05. REBRAIN In Your Head
06. awakening
07. Be Affected (featuring Fear, and Loathing in Las Vegas)
08. His/Story
09. Elegy of Prisoner
10. HERO
11. UNBROKEN (feat. Hotei Tomoyasu)
12. BIRI×BIRI -To SINGularity and Beyond- (Maozon Remix)
13.[Bonus Track] ever free (hide cover)

'SINGularity II - Hyperpaslia protoCOL - (August 10, 2022) 

1. Hyperpaslia protoCOL
2. Crescent Cutlass
3. Bucchigire
4. Life's Anoamilies
5. Judgement
6. Libra
7. The Barricase of Soul
8. As a route of ray
9. Claymore
10. Bojoh
11. Eden through the rough
12. Dominant Animal
13. Tekketsu Gravity (feat. Momoiro Clover Z)

Singles as T.M. Revolution
 BLACK OR WHITE? (May 25, 1995) [as Daisuke Asakura expd. Takanori Nishikawa]
 "独裁 -monopolize-" (Dokusai -monopolize-; Dictatorship -monopolize-) (May 13, 1996)
 臍淑女 -ヴィーナス- (Hesoshukujo -Venus-; Navel Lady -Venus-) (July 17, 1996)
 HEART OF SWORD ～夜明け前～ (HEART OF SWORD ~Yoake Mae~; HEART OF SWORD ~Before Dawn~) (November 11, 1996)
 LEVEL 4 (April 21, 1997)
 HIGH PRESSURE (July 1, 1997)
 WHITE BREATH (October 22, 1997)
 蒼い霹靂 (Aoi Hekireki; Blue Thunder) (February 25, 1998)
 HOT LIMIT (June 24, 1998)
 THUNDERBIRD (October 7, 1998)
 Burnin’ X’mas (October 28, 1998)
 WILD RUSH (February 3, 1999)
 BLACK OR WHITE? version 3 (April 19, 2000)
 HEAT CAPACITY (May 24, 2000)
 魔弾 ～Der Freischütz～/Love Saver (Madan ~Der Freischütz~; Magic Bullet ~The Freeshooter~) (September 6, 2000)
 BOARDING (February 7, 2001)
 Out of Orbit ~Triple ZERO~ (February 20, 2002)
 INVOKE (October 30, 2002)
 Albireo (February 25, 2004)
 Web of Night (July 28, 2004)
 ignited (November 3, 2004)
 vestige (August 17, 2005)
 resonance (June 11, 2008)
 Naked Arms/Sword Summit (August 11, 2010)
 Save The One, Save The All (December 1, 2010)
 FLAGS (June 22, 2011)
 Preserved Roses (with Nana Mizuki) (May 15, 2013)
 Kakumei Dualism (with Nana Mizuki) (October 23, 2013)
 HEAVEN ONLY KNOWS ~Get the Power~ (November 6, 2013)
 Count ZERO/Runners high (February 12, 2014) *Split single with SCANDAL (Runners high)
 Tsukiyabureru- Time to Smash! (August 6, 2014)
 Phantom Pain (September 3, 2014)
 DOUBLE -DEAL (August 8, 2015)
  Committed RED / Inherit the Force (April 6, 2016)
 RAIMEI (August 31, 2016)
 BIRI X BIRI (collaborated with Shuta Sueyoshi from AAA) (September 19, 2017)
 Bright Burning Shout (March 7, 2018)

Singles as Takanori Nishikawa
 His/Story / Roll The Dice (Collaborated with Hiroyuki Sawano (November 14, 2018)
 UNBROKEN (featuring Tomoyasu Hotei) (January 18, 2019)
 Crescent Cutlass (Collaborated with Hiroyuki Sawano (October 23, 2019)
 REAL X EYEZ (Collaborated with J from the band Luna Sea) (January 22, 2020)
 天秤-Libra- (Tenbin -LIBRA-; Balance -LIBRA-) (Collaborated with ASCA) (May 27, 2020)
 Eden through the rough (April 21, 2021)
 Ichiban Hikare! -Bucchigire- (July 27, 2022)

Other albums (compilations) 
 DISCORdanza: Try My Remix ~Single Collections~ (June 28, 2000) [remix album]
 B☆E☆S☆T (March 6, 2002) [compilation]
 UNDER:COVER (January 1, 2006) ["Request self-cover best album"]
 1000000000000 (June 7, 2006) [10th anniversary compilation]
 X42S-REVOLUTION (March 24, 2010) [Part of Gundam 30th Anniversary Celebration]
 UNDER:COVER 2 (February 27, 2013) ["Request self-cover best album"]
 GEISHA BOY: Anime Song Experience (August 9, 2013) [Otakon 2013 Exclusive Anime Song Compilation]
 Count ZERO / Runners high - Sengoku BASARA 4 EP (February 12, 2014) [compiled with Japanese band Scandal]
  2020 -T.M.Revolution All Time Best- (May 11, 2016)
 Be Affected (Collaborated with Fear, and Loathing in Las Vegas) (October 5, 2018)
 REAL X EYEZ (Collaborated with J from the band Luna Sea) (September 2019)
 Another Daybreak (Collaborated with J from the band Luna Sea) (December 2019)

VHS
 MAKES REVOLUTION (September 21, 1996)
 LIVE REVOLUTION 1 -MAKES REVOLUTION- (December 1, 1996)
 restoration LEVEL➝3 (May 21, 1997)
 LIVE REVOLUTION 2 -restoration LEVEL➝3- (August 1, 1997)
 triple joker (March 1, 1998)
 LIVE REVOLUTION 3 -KING OF JOKER- (June 18, 1998)
 the force (March 17, 1999)
 LIVE REVOLUTION 4 -THE FORCE- (May 21, 1999)
 0001 (September 19, 2001)

DVD
 The Summary -summarize 1- (December 19, 2001)
 The Summary -summarize 2- (December 19, 2001)
 The Summary -summarize 3- (December 19, 2001)
 The Summary -summarize 4- (December 19, 2001)
 BEST SUMMER CRUSH (December 4, 2002)
 SONIC WARP the Visual Fields (November 19, 2003)
 SEVENTH HEAVEN LIVE REVOLUTION ’04 (March 24, 2005)
 1000000000000 (June 21, 2006)
 T.M.R. Live Revolution '05 -Vertical infinity 
 T.M.R. Live Revolution '06 -Under:Cover - (April 18, 2007)
 T.M.R. Live Revolution '12 -15 Anniversary FINAL - (September 19, 2012)
 T.M.R. Live Revolution '13 -Under:Cover 2 - (February 12, 2014)
 T.M.Revolution ALL TIME VISUAL COLLECTION - (May 10, 2017)
 T.M.R. Live Revolution '16-17 -Route 20 Live at NIPPON BUDOKAN - (February 12, 2017)
 T.M.R. Live Revolution '17 -20th Anniversary Final at Saitama Super Arena - (March 28, 2018)

 Takanori Nishikawa 1th LIVE TOUR 'SINgularity - (November 27, 2019)

Soundtracks
 Rurouni Kenshin Original Soundtrack 3 (April 21, 1997)
 Rurouni Kenshin Best Theme Collection (March 21, 1998)
 Mobile Suit Gundam SEED Suit CD, Volume 4: Miguel Ayman × Nicol Amarfi (June 21, 2003)
 Mobile Suit Gundam SEED Original Soundtrack 3 (September 21, 2003)
 Mobile Suit Gundam SEED Complete Best (September 26, 2003 / January 15, 2004)
 Spider-Man 2 Original Soundtrack (June 30, 2004) [Japanese release]
 Mobile Suit Gundam SEED Original Soundtrack 4 (December 16, 2004)
 Mobile Suit Gundam SEED Destiny Complete Best Dash (November 2, 2005 / May 7, 2006)

Various artist compilations
 DAynamite Mix Juice 1 ~You know beat?~ (July 19, 2000)
 JPop CD (October 1, 2003)
 a-nation ’05 BEST HIT SELECTION (July 27, 2005)

Covers
 THE MODS TRIBUTE ~SO WHAT!!~ (April 11, 2001) ➝ "JUST SAY FUCK NO" [as Takanori Nishikawa]
 Lif-e-Motions (February 15, 2006) ➝ Cover of TRF’s "Silver and Gold dance"

The end of genesis T.M.Revolution turbo type D

Album
 Suite Season (February 2, 2000)

Singles
 陽炎 -KAGEROH- (Kagerō; Heat Haze) (June 23, 1999)
 月虹 -GEKKOH- (Gekkō; Moon Rainbow) (September 22, 1999)
 雪幻 -winter dust- (Setsugen -winter dust-; Snow Illusion -winter dust-) (November 17, 1999)

VHS
 Picture from Suite Season (March 12, 2000)
 LIVE ARENA 2000 A.D. (July 26, 2000)

DVD
 LIVE ARENA 2000 A.D. (July 26, 2000)

References

Discographies of Japanese artists
Pop music discographies